Pliobates cataloniae is a species of stem-ape that was found to be the sister taxon to gibbons and great apes like humans.
Its anatomy is gibbon-like; prior to this discovery, it was assumed that the ancestral ape bauplan was robust like Proconsul. This species has mosaic characteristics of primitive, monkey-like features and the more derived ape characteristics; it was, however, not a direct ancestor of modern apes but rather a side-branch that retained the ancestral morphotype and was thus placed in its own family Pliobatidae.

References

Prehistoric apes
Monotypic prehistoric primate genera
Prehistoric primate genera
Fossil taxa described in 2015